Why Lincoln Matters: Today More Than Ever is a book by former New York Governor Mario Cuomo published in 2004. It is a discussion of how Cuomo believes that Abraham Lincoln is relevant to contemporary US politics.

External links
Booknotes interview with Cuomo on Why Lincoln Matters, July 25, 2004.

2004 non-fiction books
Books about Abraham Lincoln